Lucknow East is a constituency of the Uttar Pradesh Legislative Assembly covering the city of Eastern part of Lucknow in the Lucknow district of Uttar Pradesh, India. A Voter-verified paper audit trail (VVPAT) facility with EVMs was used here in 2017 U.P. assembly polls.

Lucknow East is one of five assembly constituencies in the Lucknow Lok Sabha constituency. Since 2008, this assembly constituency is numbered 173 amongst 403 constituencies.

Currently this seat belongs to Bharatiya Janata Party candidate Ashutosh Tandon who won in last Assembly election of 2017 Uttar Pradesh Legislative Elections defeating Indian National Congress candidate Anurag Bhadouria by a margin of 79,230 votes.

Members of Legislative Assembly

Election results

2022

2017

2014

2012

References

External links
 

Assembly constituencies of Uttar Pradesh